Rupna Chakma (𑄢𑄪𑄛𑄴𑄚 𑄌𑄋𑄴𑄟𑄳𑄦) is a football player of Bangladesh women's national football team and Bashundhara Kings Women. She was a member of the Bangladeshi team that won gold at the 2022 SAFF Women's Championship. She was named the best goalkeeper of the tournament.

Chakma played in the under-16 team in 2019.

References 

Living people
Bangladeshi women's footballers
Bangladesh women's international footballers
Bashundhara Kings players
Bangladesh Women's Football League players
Chakma people
Bangladeshi Buddhists
Women's association football midfielders
People from Khagrachhari District
Bangladeshi women's futsal players
2004 births